My Little Old Boy (a.k.a. Mom's Diary: My Ugly Duckling) is a South Korean television entertainment program, distributed and syndicated by SBS every Sunday at 21:05 (KST).

Current hosts

Special hosts

Former hosts

References

My Little Old Boy